Kenneth William Dugdale (born 7 December 1950) is an English association football coach and former player, who manages Norwegian club Vollen UL.

Career
Born in Liverpool, Dugdale spent his early career with Kirkby Town, Aston Villa and Wolverhampton Wanderers.

He later played non-league football with Wigan Athletic, New Brighton and Burscough.

Dugdale later became a football coach, and was manager of the New Zealand national team from 1998 to 2002. Dugdale was in charge of New Zealand at the 1999 FIFA Confederations Cup, and has also managed the Football Kingz.

He has also managed Vollen UL in Norway.

Personal life
His uncle Jimmy Dugdale and brother Alan were also footballers.

References

1950 births
Living people
English footballers
English football managers
Knowsley United F.C. players
Aston Villa F.C. players
Wolverhampton Wanderers F.C. players
Wigan Athletic F.C. players
New Brighton A.F.C. players
Burscough F.C. players
Association football forwards
New Zealand national football team managers